Tazehabad-e Pasikhan (also Romanized as Tāzehābād-e Pasīkhān; also known as Tāzehābād) is a village in Molla Sara Rural District, in the Central District of Shaft County, Gilan Province, Iran. At the 2006 census, its population was 96, in 21 families.

References 

Populated places in Shaft County